Cain and Abel were the first sons of Adam and Eve in the Bible.

Cain and Abel may also refer to:

Television
 Cain and Abel (Argentine TV series), a 2010 Argentine telenovela
 Cain and Abel (Japanese TV series), a 2016 Japanese television drama series
 Cain and Abel (South Korean TV series), a 2009 South Korean television drama series

Other
 Cain and Abel (Titian), a 1540s painting by Titian
 Cain and Abel (Tintoretto), a c. 1550 painting by Tintoretto 
 Cain and Abel (1982 film), a Philippine action drama film
 Cain and Abel (2006 film), an American independent comedy film
 Cain and Abel (comics), a pair of fictional characters in the DC Comics universe
 Cain and Abel (software), a password recovery tool

See also
 Cain at Abel, Philippine television drama series
 Cains & Abels, a rock music group
 "Cane and Able" (House episode)
 "Kanes and Abel's", an episode of the television series Veronica Mars
 Kane and Abel (disambiguation)
 Abel (disambiguation)
 Cain (disambiguation)